Atenville is an unincorporated community in Lincoln County, West Virginia, United States. It is a residential community located in Harts Creek District and is part of the Harts census-designated place.

Geography
Atenville is situated at the mouth of Little Harts Creek and includes some territory on the opposite side of the Guyandotte River. Dry Branch is also part of Atenville.

History

Captain Farley's Raid 
Captain Henry Farley, a veteran of the Revolutionary War and resident of Montgomery County, Virginia, was the first known Anglo visitor to present-day Atenville. In June 1792, Captain Farley passed through the area while pursuing a Native American war party that had raided Virginia settlements at Bluestone River. By the time he reached what is today Atenville, he and his group had already engaged the retreating natives in the headwaters of Coal River and in the Guyandotte River valley some two miles below what is today Logan. Farley pursued the natives to the mouth of the Guyandotte River before returning home.

According to the F.B. Lambert Papers at Marshall University, Stephen Hart's father was killed by Native Americans at the mouth of Little Harts Creek. Big and Little Harts creeks are named for Hart's family. This incident, if true, would have happened prior to 1795.

Twentieth Century 

Atenville is named for a Mr. Aten, an employee of the C&O Railroad. Atenville had a post office from 1906-1918 and from 1922–1926. The following persons have served as postmaster: George W. Dillon (1906-1908), William M. Workman (1908-1914), Nancy Payne (1914-1915), Arnold Perry (1915-1918), Kile Topping (1922-1923), and Wilson B. Lambert (1923-1926). The post office was discontinued on February 27, 1926.

Education

For many years, Atenville was home to Atenville Grade School. The original school was situated on the east side of the Guyandotte River.

Churches

Presently, the Mt. Calvary Freewill Baptist Church and Little Harts Freewill Baptist Church are located in Atenville.

Transportation

Atenville is accessed by Route 10. CSX Railroad is located across the river.

Business

Fern Pack operated a small store at Dry Branch.

References

Unincorporated communities in Lincoln County, West Virginia
Unincorporated communities in West Virginia
Populated places on the Guyandotte River